Holkar Cricket Stadium  is located in Indore, India. It was formerly known as Maharani Usharaje Trust Cricket Ground, in 2010, Madhya Pradesh Cricket Association renamed it after the Holkar dynasty of the Marathas that ruled Indore State. It is one of the smallest international cricket ground in the world. International games have been hosted here since 2006, when the ground's first one-day international game was played here. Since then, India has a dominant record at this stadium, having only lost two international game across all formats hosted here, with the latest loss being against Australia in the Third Test of the 2023 Border-Gavaskar Trophy.

Indore city has another cricket stadium, Nehru Stadium which was used for International matches until 31 March 2001.

It has a seating capacity of around 30,000 spectators. It is equipped with flood lights for night matches. Virender Sehwag recorded the third highest ODI score of 219 at this ground. Gwalior's Captain Roop Singh Stadium, another international stadium in Madhya Pradesh, is a bit smaller than Indore's Holkar Cricket Stadium. However, capacity of Captain Roop Singh Stadium is more than this stadium.

The ground stages the majority of Madhya Pradesh cricket team's home matches in the Ranji Trophy. On 8 October 2016, It hosted its first ever Test match when India played against New Zealand. It became the twenty-second test venue in India.

History 
The credit for giving land for the stadium goes to the Holkar's of the Maratha Confederacy. 
The ruling Maratha family of Indore State encouraged and pioneered cricket in this part of the country. Holkar cricket team appeared in ten Ranji Trophy season's, reaching the final eight times and winning the title four times.

It is on the some part of this ground that an older stadium was present where the Holkar's cricket team won its three Ranji Trophy titles, in the late 1940s and early 1950s. In this sense, some part of this stadium has seen greats like C.K. Nayudu and Mushtaq Ali playing for Ranji Trophy.

The stadium has hosted a total of five ODIs (2006, 2008, 2011, 2015, and 2017), 2 Tests (2016 and 2019) and 3 T20Is (2017, 2020, 2022). Apart from these the venue has witnessed a total of 9 IPL matches. Team India had a 100% winning record at this stadium until 4 October 2022, losing to South Africa by 49 runs in a T20I match during the South Africa Tour of India in 2022.

The first match was staged on 15 April 2006, India successfully chased 289 to complete a 5–0 series win on England in what was a dead rubber. Its second international match came two and a half years later when England next toured, India again winning. The rest three ODIs were against West Indies, South Africa and Australia.

The Stadium hosted its first ever IPL match on 13 May 2011. The Jawaharlal Nehru Stadium, Kochi is the home venue for the Indian Premier League team Kochi Tuskers Kerala and officially hosted 5 home-matches of the franchise. The remaining 2 home matches were played at the Holkar Cricket Stadium. In 2017, Kings XI Punjab selected the Holkar stadium as one of their home grounds for three IPL matches.

Virender Sehwag made the highest runs in a limited over innings of cricket 219 here on 8 December 2011 against West Indies, which was later broken by Rohit Sharma.

In November 2015, the stadium was selected to be one of the six new Test venues along with Maharashtra Cricket Association Stadium, JSCA International Stadium Complex, Saurashtra Cricket Association Stadium, Himachal Pradesh Cricket Association Stadium and Dr. Y.S. Rajasekhara Reddy ACA-VDCA Cricket Stadium in India.

Holkar Stadium hosted its first Test match in October 2016 when New Zealand cricket team toured India. India defeated New Zealand by 321 runs on the fourth day to complete a 3–0 series whitewash. The second Test match was played between India and Bangladesh in 2019.

The Stadium was selected to host the final of the 2016-17 edition of the Ranji Trophy from 10 January 2017.

Stadium hosted 2 international matches in 2017, One Day International between Indian Cricket Team & Australian Cricket Team was played on 24 September 2017 whereas T20 International between Indian Cricket Team & Sri Lanka Cricket Team was played in December 2017. In this T20I match Rohit Sharma scored his 2nd T20I century. He scored 118 runs from 43 balls

Names of places in stadium 
In 2011, a committee was formed to decide the naming of Pavilion, Dressing Rooms and Stands/Galleries around the stadium. This committee had Surya Prakash Chaturvedi as the chairman. As per the recommendations of the committee following landmarks have been named :

 Press Box named after HH Maharaja Madhav Rao Scindia of Gwalior State (President of Madhya Pradesh Cricket Association & Board of Control for Cricket in India) 
 Pavilion's named after Col. C.K. Nayudu (India's First Test Captain) and Capt. Mushtaq Ali (First Asian batsman to score a century).
 Dressing Room's named after Mansur Ali Khan Pataudi (Born in Bhopal) and Rahul Dravid (Born in Indore).
 Stadium Gates named after former International cricketers from this part of the country, who are Narendra Hirwani, Amay Khurasia and Rajesh Chauhan.
 One of the two galleries contains Stands named after greats of Indian cricket like Vijay Hazare, Ajit Wadekar, Sunil Gavaskar, Kapil Dev, Sachin Tendulkar and Anil Kumble. The other gallery contains stands named after greats of Holkar era like J. N. Bhaya, M. M. Jagdale, Khandu Rangnekar, Hiralal Gaekwad, Chandu Sarwate and C. S. Nayudu. This combination of current and former cricketers named opposite to each other is unique in itself and not been seen elsewhere.
 The commentators' Box in the stadium has been named after Sushil Doshi, renowned Hindi commentator.

List of international matches

Test Matches

One-day Internationals

Twenty20 Internationals

List of international centuries

Key
 * denotes that the batsman was not out.
 Inns. denotes the number of the innings in the match.
 Balls denotes the number of balls faced in an innings.
 NR denotes that the number of balls was not recorded.
 Parentheses next to the player's score denotes his century number at Edgbaston.
 The column title Date refers to the date the match started.
 The column title Result refers to the player's team result

Test Centuries

One Day Internationals

Twenty20 Internationals

List of five wicket hauls

Tests

One Day Internationals

See also
Yeshwant Club, Indore
Daly College, Indore
Daly College Ground, Indore
Yeshwant Club Ground, Indore 
Gwalior International Cricket Stadium

References

External links
  ESPNcricinfo Website - Ground Page
 CricketArchive

Cricket grounds in Madhya Pradesh
Sports venues in Indore
1990 establishments in Madhya Pradesh
Test cricket grounds in India
Kochi Tuskers Kerala
Sports venues completed in 1990
20th-century architecture in India